Hubert Allan Nichols (26 July 1864 – 21 August 1940) was an Australian politician. He was born at Macquarie Plains, Tasmania. In 1902 he was elected to the Tasmanian Legislative Council as the Independent member for Mersey, leading the Opposition group in the Council from May 1906 to January 1909. In 1924 he was defeated, but he was elected to Meander in 1926, serving until 1935. Nichols died in 1940 in Ulverstone.

References

1864 births
1940 deaths
Independent members of the Parliament of Tasmania
Members of the Tasmanian Legislative Council
20th-century Australian politicians